Caroline "Carol" Ferris is a fictional character appearing in the . She is one of many characters who has used the name Star Sapphire, and was the long-time love interest of Hal Jordan, the Silver Age Green Lantern. In her role as Star Sapphire, Ferris has been active as both a supervillain and, more recently, as a superhero. Her original design was based on Elizabeth Taylor.

Carol Ferris made her cinematic debut in the 2011 film Green Lantern, portrayed by Blake Lively.

Publication history
Carol Ferris first appears in Showcase #22 and was created by John Broome and Gil Kane. Her Star Sapphire form did not appear until Green Lantern vol. 2 #16.

Fictional character biography

Early history
Carol Ferris is Ferris Aircraft's vice president, as well as the only child of aerospace mogul Carl Ferris and his wife Christine. She hires Hal Jordan and quickly finds herself attracted to him. He is secretly the superhero Green Lantern. However, the young couple's romance quickly becomes complicated when Carol takes over the company from her father and the Zamarons crown her the new Star Sapphire. When the Zamarons discover that she is in love with Green Lantern, a servant of their estranged friends, the Guardians of the Universe, they send her to defeat Hal in battle as Star Sapphire.

Star Sapphire and Green Lantern duel several times over the years. Each time Jordan defeats her, she reverts to normal. The two separate when Carol is engaged to Jason Belmore; later she is confined to a wheelchair. It is around this time that Carol finds out that Hal Jordan is Green Lantern.

Secret Origin
The Green Lantern: Secret Origin storyline revises parts of Carol and Hal's history. In this retelling, the two first meet when they are eight, as they watch Hal's father, Carl Ferris' best friend, experience mechanical problems with his plane. With a choice between crash landing in Coast City or the nearby desert, Hal's father chose to fly into the desert. Over the years, the guilt over the accident eats away at Carol's father, eventually driving him to sickness, forcing Carol to give up her dream of being a pilot and take over as CEO of Ferris Air. Unwilling to have people know of her father's illness, Carol tells them that he retired to Miami. Hal hated Ferris for what happened to his father, but, after discovering the truth, he and Carol find solace in each other's grief. However, their relationship is stifled by Carol's refusal to date employees.

Predator
When Carol Ferris is cured of her evil Star Sapphire persona, she develops a third subconscious identity, the male "Predator". Deprived of Hal Jordan's love at the time, Carol finds everything she wants from a man in the Predator—masculinity, strength, and care. Physically separated from Carol's body, the Predator repeatedly appears as a mysterious figure, protecting Ferris Aircraft from the threats of Eclipso, the Demolition Team and Jason Bloch. He also establishes the company Intercontinental Petroleum (Con-Trol) to let her regain control of Ferris Aircraft. Finally, the Predator starts to court Carol (who does not know what the Predator really is) and battles Hal Jordan for her love. Hal defeats him and witnesses him merging with Carol into Star Sapphire.

Now fully evil, Carol takes over ruling Zamaron but her reign is short; the Zamarons, following the Crisis on Infinite Earths, abandon their queen and their homeworld to live in another dimension with their male counterparts, the Guardians of the Universe. Carol gets furious and vows revenge on Hal and the Green Lantern Corps. After several battles, Carol finds her chance to hurt her ex-lover and murder Katma Tui, whose power ring is rendered inert following the destruction of the main power battery on Oa. Hal keeps John Stewart (Katma's husband) from killing Carol, straining their friendship in the process.

In the third Green Lantern series, the nature of the Predator entity is retconned as being a parasite creature from the planet Maltus. The entity corrupted Carol and is responsible for making her murder Katma. The Green Lantern Corps purge Carol of the entity, saving her life in the process. But her time under the creature's control, along with the destruction of Coast City and the discovery that her father faked her mother's death, causes Carol to reject a distraught Hal Jordan. Instead, she opts to stay with her mother and find her own path.

However, Carol is not gone from the world of super-heroism for long. She becomes the administrator of Extreme Justice's Mount Thunder facility. Her time with the team comes with the revelation that she is pregnant, despite not having sex in a long time. She realizes that Star Sapphire was not a subconscious identity created by her, but an energy-based being who inhabited her body. The child in her womb was conceived when the Predator entity raped the first Star Sapphire. Shortly after she gives birth, Neron appears and offers to purge her of both Predator and Star Sapphire. Carol agrees, and then watches as the now separate entities are killed by Neron, who departs with their baby in his arms.

Ultimately though, the events of Infinite Crisis effectively wipe out the above-mentioned stories. Blackest Night #1 establishes that in an untold story, Carol gets free of the Star Sapphire persona sometime before Katma Tui's death. The Sapphire found a new, unnamed Star Sapphire, and it was she who committed the murder. Furthermore, much of the Predator's backstory is changed. "The Predator" is re-introduced as one of the manifestations in the emotional spectrum; the living embodiment of love. The entity is held by the Zamarons on their home world. It gets freed during Sinestro's liberation of his Yellow Lanterns during the 2009–2010 "Blackest Night" storyline.

End of Star Sapphire
In Green Lantern (vol. 3) #119, Hal (as the Spectre) decides to visit Carol. He makes himself visible and tells Carol he is going to help her, but that she will not remember his visit. He reaches into Carol and pulls out the Star Sapphire gem, which causes Star Sapphire herself to re-emerge (it appeared she was previously killed by Neron, but somehow a part of her survived in Carol). The Spectre detains Star Sapphire and puts her back into the gem. He hands the gem to Carol and lets her finish the job, which she does (essentially finally killing the Star Sapphire persona that would take control of her), and starts feeling much better.

In Green Lantern: Rebirth #6, Hal and Carol finally come to terms with their relationship. In Northern California at Ferris Aircraft, Carol Ferris is reminiscing over her former life when a mysterious power revitalises and reforms the abandoned, condemned fields. Hal Jordan, using his powers as the Spectre, appears. She asks Hal whether he remembers anything from when he was the Spectre. Hal says he remembers it as if he were watching it from the outside. How Spectre thinks, and who he talked to beyond this life, Hal cannot recall. Hal apologizes for everything Carol had to go through. Carol says she survived and that she is not going to sell the airbase. She says that if Hal can rebuild his life, so can she, and that she is going to do so with her husband, Gil. Carol says that she can use a good pilot. Hal says that he appreciates the offer, but he has other plans.

Return
The Star Sapphire crystal briefly possesses Carol, before detecting that Hal Jordan had feelings for his fellow pilot, Jillian "Cowgirl" Pearlman, and leaves Carol's body. She and Hal work together to free Cowgirl from the crystal. Knowing that she still loves Hal and that it is not fair to her husband, she files for divorce.

The Star Sapphires, sensing the heartache Carol has been carrying over Hal (Hal quit because he could not be near her without wanting to be with her and Carol does not date employees), send a violet power ring to her, transforming her into one of their number. She is seen wearing her original Star Sapphire costume, reciting the Corps' oath along with various other members of the Star Sapphires.

The Blackest Night: Tales of the Corps miniseries reveals the exchange between Carol and the violet ring sent to her. The ring says that all those chosen to wield the violet light must accept it willingly (this appears to overcome the controlling aspect of the violet light). It also tells Carol that she has a hole in her heart, as she has continually put aside her own happiness for the benefit of others. Because she is capable of doing this, Carol could become the most powerful Star Sapphire in the universe. The Zamarons recognized this and sent Carol the ring with the intention of having her lead the Star Sapphire army into battle alongside the Green Lantern Corps. Carol refuses to accept the ring, which shows her a vision of the War of Light and indicates that Hal Jordan will not survive. It tells her that by accepting the ring, she can save him. Still having feelings for Hal, Carol accepts and is called back to Zamaron by Queen Aga'po. Carol's army awaits to defend the planet from the approaching Sinestro Corps.

In her first battle, Carol takes on Sinestro who says that he has never held ill will toward Carol and wonders why she is doing this for a man who has never truly given his heart toward her. The fight takes a turn when Carol attempts to encase him in one of the brainwashing crystals that the Zamarons use to "recruit" new followers. Sinestro lashes out after witnessing a vision of Arin Sur, his former love, blasting Carol across the battlefield. She is then subdued by Sinestro and two other Yellow Lanterns. Before he can capitalise on the advantage, the Black Lanterns invade, led by Amon Sur, shocking both Carol and Sinestro. The two are rescued from certain death by Hal and the Indigo Tribe. The group escapes Zamaron moments before Black Lantern rings reanimate the bodies of the two beings whose love fueled the Star Sapphire's central power battery, devastating the planet in the process. For some reason, the loss of the Star Sapphire's power source does not seem to affect Carol's powers. It is revealed that the Queen was powering the violet rings in the absence of the central power battery; this, however, is causing her to age.

After a failed attempt to combine the light of her power ring with the six lights coming from the other Corps-Leaders makes Nekron able to possess resurrected heroes, Ganthet forces a secret protocol in her ring, forcing Carol to seek out a deputy. Eventually, she deputizes Wonder Woman as a temporary Star Sapphire, due to her great ability to feel love, thus undoing Nekron's control of the Amazon. The Lanterns are then attacked by the Black Lantern Spectre. In an attempt to stop the Spectre, Hal releases Parallax's essence, deciding to join with him again to fight back. Carol tries to stop Hal, but he refuses to be swayed. Carol kisses Hal, telling him "I love you", before Hal allows Parallax to possess him. In the epilogue of Blackest Night, Carol wants to talk to Hal about their relationship, but Sinestro comes along and interrupts their talk to serve his own goals. She is in Las Vegas where she takes on the Predator who has possessed a man who is infatuated with a young woman to the point of obsession. She frees him from the Predator by kissing him. After that, Carol and Hal are taken to Zamaron. The Queen gives her life to sustain the central power battery and gives her title to Carol Ferris.

During the "Brightest Day" storyline, Queen Khea opens a portal from Hawkworld to Zamaron. She and her manhawks start an invasion on Zamaron when Carol and the Predator appear. Carol battles the Hawk family Hawkman and Hawkgirl to a standstill while trying not to destroy the universe. She is saved by Hawkman and Hawkgirl. They manage to do this because of their great love for each other, a greater love than she and Hal Jordan could ever have. Carol and the other leaders of the color corps are later sucked into the Black Book, although Hal is able to escape with her ring. Guy Gardner later uses Carol's ring along with Atrocitus's Red Lantern ring to remove Parallax from the central power battery. Hal and Kyle Rayner rescue her and the rest of those stuck in there from the Black Book. After Krona is killed by Hal, she reclaims the violet ring of the Zamarons. When Hal is stripped of his ring, she returns with him to Earth.

The New 52
In 2011, "The New 52" rebooted the DC universe. Carol removes the Star Sapphire ring and bails Hal Jordan out of jail after he saw a woman being attacked on a film shoot and thinks it's real. Carol offers Hal a job at Ferris Aircraft, but not as a pilot because of insurance issues. Hal asks her out to dinner and Carol thinks he is going to propose. When he does not, she walks out on him and drives away, leaving him without a ride. Later, Carol is shocked by the TV news and finds Hal was working with Sinestro. After Hal returns to Earth, he asks Carol to take him back after telling her she is the one person he thought of when he thought he was going to die. Carol accepts Hal's apology and they renew their relationship.

When Sinestro forces Hal to assist him by threatening to kill Carol, she dons the Star Sapphire ring so that she can eventually help Hal, but Hal and Sinestro are confronted by the Indigo Tribe, who take both of them and teleport away.

When Kyle Rayner comes to Ferris Aircraft looking for Hal, he and Carol witness Hal and Sinestro fighting Black Hand, prompting Carol to re-don her Star Sapphire ring to help Kyle fight off Black Hand's Black Lanterns. However, when they arrive at the scene of the fight, they discover nothing but more 'conventional' zombies and are informed that Hal and Sinestro are apparently dead. However, Carol rejects the idea that Hal is dead as the link between her heart and his which she can sense via her ring is still intact, with her ring's visions informing her that Kyle must unite the powers of all seven Corps in himself to stop this latest threat.

When the First Lantern is freed, he begins to drain off all the Lantern Corps of their emotions, minds, and memories with the intention of seeing how their life choices had changed them. In the illusions of Carol, she is battling the Atlantean warship on the carrier, but she eventually regains her Star Sapphire ring and escapes from the First Lantern's influencing powers. Carol locates Kyle and helps him after he is attacked by the First Lantern.

After getting a lock on Sinestro's location, Carol and Kyle arrive at the planet Korugar's ruins, where Sinestro attacks them both, blaming them for his home's destruction by the First Lantern. When Carol demands to know where Hal is, Sinestro states that Hal is dead, but Carol refuses to believe him and attacks. While they attack Sinestro, Green Lanterns Simon Baz and B'dg arrive and subdue Sinestro. Simon (who met Hal) tells Carol that Hal is alive, but trapped in the Dead Zone. In the final battle, Carol and the reserve Lantern Corps attack the First Lantern. When the First Lantern is finally destroyed, Carol reunites with Hal after he escapes from the Dead Zone.

Despite her past with Hal, Carol goes on to develop feelings for Kyle as she spends more time with him as he explores his White Lantern abilities, to the extent that she is one of the few people aware of his survival after he seemingly sacrifices himself to recharge the emotional spectrum. When Kyle splits the White Lantern ring into seven after realizing that the power is too great for him to control on his own, he chooses Carol as one of the six new members of the White Lantern Corps; however, she decides to keep her violet ring.

DC Rebirth
In 2016, DC Comics implemented another relaunch of its books called "DC Rebirth", which restored its continuity to a form much as it was prior to "The New 52". Carol is able to sense Hal's actions when he creates a ring out of willpower. Sometime later, Carol returns to Earth. Hal thinks about her throughout the Hal Jordan and the Green Lantern Corps run, and his greatest desire is revealed to be having a family with her, as previously shown in the Book of Oa. When Carol and Hal finally reunite, they kiss.

Powers and abilities

Carol is a capable pilot and administrator. As Star Sapphire, she can use her gem of power to fly and to hurl blasts of force nearly equal to the power of a Green Lantern's ring. Moreover, the Sapphire bestows upon her a certain amount of invulnerability and allows her to survive in airless space. During the most recent battle with Star Sapphire, Carol was temporarily empowered by Hal's ring, granting her strength and a certain degree of invulnerability. During this, Carol was clad in a version of her Sapphire uniform, but with Green Lantern design. These powers were provided by exposure to Hal's power ring and were temporary. Carol now wields a less powerful violet power ring as a member of the Star Sapphires, which replicates her original powers as Star Sapphire to a degree as well. Despite being helplessly overwhelmed before, Carol's previous exposures to the Star Sapphire's power are assumed to have given her a certain tolerance to the violet ring's current influence.

Other versions
 In the alternate universe seen in the story "Whom Gods Destroy" in which the Nazis were not defeated in World War II, Jordan and Ferris eventually becomes President and First Lady of the United States, respectively.
 In the 1998 Elseworlds miniseries JLA: The Nail, which is inspired by the Silver Age versions of DC Comics characters, Carol Ferris/Star Sapphire is both a villain and a love interest of Hal Jordan.
 In the 2002 miniseries Green Lantern: Evil's Might, set during the American women's suffrage movement, Carol is a New York City suffragette and is swept up in a conflict for worker's safety, her hand in marriage, and control of green power rings that have surfaced in town.
 Carol Ferris has a central role in Darwyn Cooke's 2004 miniseries DC: The New Frontier.
 Carol Ferris makes an appearance in the 2005—2007 miniseries Justice, in which she is taken hostage by the allegiance of arch supervillains because of her relationship to Green Lantern.
 In the alternate timeline of the 2011 "Flashpoint" storyline, Carol Ferris, with Hal Jordan, was on an F-22 Raptor jet entering Western Europe territory before the Shark attacks. Hal forces the Shark to crash his jet into Carol's jet, and both of them barely escape using the ejection system. Upon their return to America, Carol thinks Hal is not living up to his potential. Later, Amazon invisible planes invade over Coast City and Hal and Carol manage to shoot them down and the hydra they dropped on the city. Afterward, Carol is angry at Hal for taking a mission for the U.S. government. Carol insists on joining him in the dropping of the Green Arrow Industries nuclear missile. Hal refuses; however, she goes anyway. During the battles, Carol sees Hal drop the missile through New Themyscira's invisible shield but he is killed in the process. Afterward, Carol returns to Coast City, where Thomas Kalmaku gives her a note saying that Hal was too afraid to say that he had always loved her. Carol sees the engagement ring that he was going to propose to her with.
 In the distant future, the Book of Oa shows that Carol will eventually marry Hal and their son would be named Martin Jordan after Hal's father.
 In the miniseries Star Trek/Green Lantern: The Spectrum War, in which the universe was destroyed by Nekron, Carol is one of the few survivors after Ganthet sacrifices himself to initiate the 'Last Light' protocol, sending himself, the last ring-wielders, and the last six rings of the other six corps into the new Star Trek universe. While Pavel Chekov is experimenting with his new Blue Lantern ring, he encounters Carol with a wounded Saint Walker, who asks Chekov for help. Although Leonard McCoy—the chosen wielder of the Indigo ring—is able to confirm that Walker will recover, Carol reveals to Hal that Nekron has been drawn into their new universe as well. She then joins the crew in the final battle against Nekron on the reborn Vulcan, culminating in Nekron's defeat while she joins the Enterprise on his mission. After a year traveling with the Enterprise, Carol has begun a relationship with Montgomery Scott, although Leonard McCoy is the first other person on the crew to learn about it.

Reception
Carol Ferris was ranked 36th in Comics Buyer's Guide's "100 Sexiest Women in Comics" list. Star Sapphire was ranked fourth on Comicverse's "Top 5 DC Comics Villains Turned Heroic" list.

In other media

Television

 Star Sapphire appears in the DC Animated Universe (DCAU) series Justice League and Justice League Unlimited, voiced by Olivia d'Abo. While her origins are never elaborated upon and her identity is never stated on-screen, the show's creators have confirmed she is intended to be Carol Ferris. Throughout both series, she has joined Lex Luthor and Aresia's Injustice Gangs and Gorilla Grodd's Secret Society.
 Carol Ferris as Star Sapphire appears in Batman: The Brave and the Bold, voiced by Rachel Quaintance and the latter by Vicki Lewis respectively. This version was abducted by the Zamarons, who imbued their queen's spirit into her before bestowing her with a violet power ring, causing her to lose control of her body. In the episode "Scorn of the Star Sapphire!", Star Sapphire attempts to open a portal to allow a Zamaron army to invade Earth, but Hal Jordan and Batman repel the invasion while Ferris eventually regains control and casts the Star Sapphire out of her body, at the cost of her memories as her. Star Sapphire also makes a minor appearance in the episode "Powerless!" as part of a hypothetical scenario that Captain Atom uses to explain how Batman's lack of powers makes him vulnerable.
 Carol Ferris appears in Green Lantern: The Animated Series, voiced by Jennifer Hale. In the episode "...In Love and War", the Star Sapphires give her a ring and bring her to their home world, where she learns Hal Jordan is Green Lantern. Furious at seeing him with another girl, she attacks him. After Jordan helps her come to her senses, she relinquishes her ring and goes back to Earth. In the episode "The New Guy", she breaks up with him. In the episode "Love is a Battlefield", she regains her ring to battle Atrocitus, renews her relationship with Jordan, and keeps her ring just in case.
 Carol Ferris appears in the Young Justice episode "Depths", voiced by Kari Wahlgren.
 Carol Ferris as Star Sapphire appears in Justice League Action.
 Carol Ferris as Star Sapphire appears in DC Super Hero Girls (2019), voiced again by Kari Wahlgren. This version is a teenager obsessed with her ex-boyfriend, Hal Jordan, who broke up with her on Valentine's Day, and became Star Sapphire to get revenge on him and destroy Jessica Cruz, who she believes is Jordan's new girlfriend.

Film

 Carol Ferris appears in Justice League: The New Frontier, voiced by Brooke Shields.
 Carol Ferris appears in Green Lantern: First Flight, voiced again by Olivia d'Abo.
 Carol Ferris as Star Sapphire appears in Justice League: Doom, voiced again by Olivia d'Abo. This version became Star Sapphire after Hal Jordan broke her heart in an unspecified manner and developed a desire to kill him ever since, which leads to her being recruited into Vandal Savage's Legion of Doom to kill the Justice League. As part of Savage's plans, Ferris breaks Jordan's will by exposing him to a diluted version of Scarecrow's fear gas and using an android replica of herself to make him believe she had been killed by a terrorist that he could have easily defeated before harm befell her. As he mourns Ferris' apparent death, she berates him for his failure to save her and for driving her to become a Star Sapphire. Jordan briefly relinquishes his ring, but Batman arrives and reveals Ferris' deception. After regrouping, the League storm the Hall of Doom, where Jordan engages Ferris in battle before defeating her and taking her gem.
 Carol Ferris appears in Green Lantern, portrayed by Blake Lively. This version is a childhood friend of Hector Hammond and Hal Jordan and the vice president of Ferris Aircraft.
 Carol Ferris as Star Sapphire appears in Teen Titans Go! & DC Super Hero Girls: Mayhem in the Multiverse, voiced again by Kari Wahlgren. This version is a member of the Legion of Doom.

Video games
 Carol Ferris as Star Sapphire appears in DC Universe Online as part of the "War of the Light Part 2" DLC pack.
 Carol Ferris as Star Sapphire appears as a playable character in Lego Batman 3: Beyond Gotham, voiced again by Olivia d'Abo.
 Carol Ferris as Star Sapphire appears as a playable character in Infinite Crisis.
 Carol Ferris as Star Sapphire appears as a playable character in DC Unchained.
 Carol Ferris as Star Sapphire appears as support cards in Injustice 2.
 Carol Ferris as Star Sapphire appears as a playable character in Lego DC Super-Villains.

Miscellaneous
 Carol Ferris as Star Sapphire appears in the graphic audio novel Green Lantern Sleepers #3.
 Carol Ferris appears in issue #11 of the Young Justice tie-in comic book.
 Carol Ferris appears in the Injustice: Gods Among Us prequel comic as Hal Jordan's on-and-off girlfriend.
 Carol Ferris as Star Sapphire appears in DC Super Hero Girls (2015), voiced by Jessica DiCicco.

Merchandise
 An action figure of Carol Ferris as Star Sapphire was sold in a 3-pack with action figures of Black Hand and Green Lantern.
 An action figure of Carol Ferris as Star Sapphire was sold as part of wave two of Mattel's DC Universe Classics Green Lantern sub-line.

References

External links
 Carol Ferris Profile
 Emerald Dawn.com: Star Sapphire Biography
 GL Corps.org: Star Sapphire Biography
 GL Freak: Star Sapphire Biography
 Star Sapphire Rapsheet
 The Unofficial Carol Ferris Biography
 The Unofficial Predator Biography
 The Unofficial Star Sapphire II (Carol Ferris) Biography

Villains in animated television series
Characters created by Gil Kane
Characters created by John Broome
Comics characters introduced in 1959
DC Comics characters who have mental powers
DC Comics characters with accelerated healing
DC Comics female superheroes
DC Comics female supervillains
Fictional avatars
Fictional aviators
Fictional characters with energy-manipulation abilities
Fictional characters who can manipulate light
Fictional characters who can turn invisible
Fictional characters who can turn intangible
Fictional characters with density control abilities
Fictional characters with elemental transmutation abilities
Fictional characters with elemental and environmental abilities
Fictional female businesspeople

de:Green Lantern#Carol Ferris